Pyrenaearia is a genus of  air-breathing land snails, terrestrial pulmonate gastropod mollusks or micromollusks in the subfamily Leptaxinae of the family  Hygromiidae, the harry snails and their allies. 

These snails live in limestone areas in the Pyrenees mountains of southwestern Europe.

Species 
Species in the genus Pyrenaearia:
 Pyrenaearia cantabrica (Hidalgo, 1873)
 Pyrenaearia carascalensis (Férussac, 1821) - type species
 Pyrenaearia carascalopsis (Bourguignat in Fagot, 1884)
 Pyrenaearia cotiellae (Fagot, 1906)
 Pyrenaearia daanidentata Raven, 1988
 Pyrenaearia guillenae Caro, Madeira & Gómez-Moliner, 2019
 Pyrenaearia molae Haas, 1924
 Pyrenaearia navasi (Fagot, 1907)

 Pyrenaearia organiaca (Fagot, 1905)
 Pyrenaearia parva Ortiz de Zárate, 1956
Synonyms
 Pyrenaearia oberthueri (Ancey, 1884): synonym of Pyrenaearia cantabrica (Hidalgo, 1873)
 Pyrenaearia poncebensis Ortiz de Zárate, 1956: synonym of Pyrenaearia cantabrica poncebensis Ortiz de Zárate López, 1956
 Pyrenaearia schaufussii (Kobelt, 1876): synonym of Pyrenaearia cantabrica schaufussi (Kobelt, 1876) (not assessed)
 Pyrenaearia velascoi (Hidalgo, 1867): synonym of Pyrenaearia carascalensis (Michaud, 1831)

References 

 Bank, R. A. (2017). Classification of the Recent terrestrial Gastropoda of the World. Last update: July 16th, 2017

Further reading 
 Hesse, P. (1921). Beiträge zur näheren Kenntnis der Subfamilie Fruticicolinae. Archiv für Molluskenkunde, 53 (1/2): 55-83. Frankfurt am Main [
Elejalde M. A., Madeira M. J., Prieto C. E., Backeljau T., Gómez-Moliner B. J. (July 2009) "Molecular Phylogeny, Taxonomy, and Evolution of the Land Snail Genus Pyrenaearia (Gastropoda, Helicoidea)". American Malacological Bulletin 27(1-2): 69-81. 

 
Hygromiidae
Taxonomy articles created by Polbot